James, Jamie, Jim, or Jimmy Roberts may refer to:

Entertainment and journalism
 James Roberts (printer) (1564–1606), English printer of Elizabethan literature
 James Roberts (painter) (1753-ca.1809), English portrait painter
 James C. Roberts (born 1946), founder of Radio America
 James J. Roberts (born 1947), American journalist
 Jimmy Roberts (born 1957), sports broadcaster for NBC
 Jimmy Roberts (composer), composer of the musical I Love You, You're Perfect, Now Change
 Jimmy Roberts (musician), saxophonist. Member of rock groups, Truck, Young
 Jimmy Roberts (singer) (1924–1999), American singer, featured on the Lawrence Welk Show
 Jim Roberts, singer/songwriter/lyricist in 1960s and 1970s, member of Seatrain

Sports

Football and rugby
 James Roberts (footballer, born 1878) (1878–?), Bradford City A.F.C. and Wales international footballer
 James Roberts (footballer, born 1891) (1891–?), Wrexham A.F.C. and Wales international footballer
 James Roberts (footballer, born 1996), Oxford United F.C. footballer
 Jamie Roberts (born 1986), rugby union player
 James Roberts (football and futsal) (born 1948), Australian footballer and national futsal coach
 James Roberts (rugby league) (born 1993), Australian rugby league footballer
 Jimmy Roberts (Australian footballer) (1883–1961), Australian rules footballer for Geelong
 Jim Roberts (Australian footballer) (1931–2013), Australian rules footballer for Geelong
 James Soto Roberts (born 1992), Liberian footballer

Other sports
 Jim Roberts (baseball) (1895–1984), former MLB player
 James Roberts (cricketer) (1864–1911), English cricketer
 James Roberts (Liberian athlete) (born 1936), Liberian sprinter
 Jim Roberts (ice hockey, born 1940) (1940–2015), NHL player for Montreal and St. Louis
 Jim Roberts (ice hockey, born 1956), retired NHL player for Minnesota
 James Roberts (British athlete) (born 1986), wheelchair basketball player
 James Roberts (swimmer) (born 1991), Australian swimmer

Other people
 James Roberts (slave narrative) (1753–?), American slave
 James Reynolds Roberts (1826–1859), English recipient of the Victoria Cross
 James A. Roberts (1847–1922), American lawyer and politician
 James Thomas Roberts (1871–1956), Sierra Leonean reverend and educationalist
 James Roberts (trade unionist) (1878–1967), New Zealand trade unionist and member of Legislative Council
 Sir James Roberts, 1st Baronet (1848–1935), Yorkshire industrialist and businessman
 J. O. M. Roberts (1916–1997), British mountaineer and explorer
 Jim Roberts (architect) (1922–2019), British architect
 James E. Roberts (1930–2006), American engineer
 Jimmie T. Roberts (1939–2015), founder of The Brethren cult
 J. J. M. Roberts (Jimmy Jack McBee Roberts, born 1939), American theologian